is a Japanese animation studio founded in 2002. The studio is a subsidiary of Fun-Media, a Holdings company, who also owns animation studios Assez Finaud Fabric and Zexcs, which are also located in the same building as Feel.

History
Feel was established in Koganei, Tokyo on December 26, 2002 by ex-Studio Pierrot staff that specializes in the production of anime. To date, the studio have presented various well-known works, including Kissxsis, Outbreak Company, My Teen Romantic Comedy SNAFU seasons 2 and 3, Dagashi Kashi, Tsuki ga Kirei, and Hinamatsuri.

Productions

Television series

Original video animations

Original net animation

References

External links
 Official website 
 

 
Japanese companies established in 2002
Animation studios in Tokyo
Japanese animation studios
Mass media companies established in 2002